Pākehā (or Pakeha without macrons;) is a Māori-language term for New Zealanders primarily of European descent. Pākehā is not a legal concept and has no definition under New Zealand law. The term can apply to light-skinned persons, or to any non-Māori New Zealander. Papa'a has a similar meaning in Cook Islands Māori.

Historically, before the arrival of other ethnic groups, the word Māori meant 'ordinary' or 'normal'. The arrival of Europeans led to the formation of a new term to distinguish the self-regarded 'ordinary' or 'normal' Māori from the new arrivals. The etymology of the word Pākehā remains unclear, but the term was in use by the late-18th century. In December 1814 the Māori children at Rangihoua in the Bay of Islands were "no less eager to see the packaha than the grown folks".
When the word was first adopted into English, the usual plural was 'Pakehas'. However, speakers of New Zealand English are increasingly removing the terminal 's' and treating the term as a collective noun.

Opinions of the term vary amongst European New Zealanders. A survey of 6,507 New Zealanders in 2009 showed no support for the claim that the term Pākehā is associated with a negative evaluation; however, some reject it on the ground that they claim it is offensive, or they object to being named in a language other than their own. In 2013 the New Zealand Attitudes and Values Study carried out by the University of Auckland found no evidence that the word was widely considered to be derogatory; however, only 12 per cent of New Zealanders of European descent actively chose to be identified by the term, with the remainder preferring 'New Zealander' (53 per cent), 'New Zealand European' (25 per cent) and/or 'Kiwi' (17 per cent) which is another Māori word.

Meaning
The Oxford general English language dictionary defines Pākehā as 'a white New Zealander', The Oxford Dictionary of New Zealandisms (2010) defines Pākehā as a noun 'a light-skinned non-Polynesian New Zealander, especially one of British birth or ancestry as distinct from a Māori; a European or white person'; and as an adjective 'of or relating to Pākehā; non-Māori; European, white'.

Māori in the Bay of Islands and surrounding districts had no doubts about the meaning of the word  in the 19th century. In 1831, thirteen  from the Far North met at Kerikeri to compose a letter to King William IV, seeking protection from the French, "the tribe of Marion". Written in Māori, the letter used the word  to mean 'British European', and the words  to mean 'strangers (non-British)'—as shown in the translation that year of the letter from Māori to English by the missionary William Yate.

However, The Concise Māori Dictionary (Kāretu, 1990) defines the word  as 'foreign, foreigner (usually applied to white person)', while the English–Māori, Māori–English Dictionary (Biggs, 1990) defines Pākehā as 'white (person)'. Sometimes the term applies more widely to include all non-Māori. No Māori dictionary cites  as derogatory. Some early Pākehā settlers who lived among Māori and adopted aspects of Māoritanga became known as 'Pākehā Māori'.

Etymology
When Europeans first arrived they rowed to shore in longboats, facing backwards. This is supposed to have led to the belief that the sailors were supernatural beings.

In her book The Trial of the Cannibal Dog: The Remarkable Story of Captain Cook's Encounters in the South Seas, the anthropologist Anne Salmond recorded that tribal traditions held that Toiroa, a tohunga from Mahia, had predicted the coming of the Europeans. He said "", meaning "it is the pakerewhā", red and white strangers.

There have been several dubious interpretations given to the word. The word  itself may come from the proto-Polynesian root puaka, known in every Polynesian language ( in Tongan, Uvean, Futunian, Rapa, Marquisian, Niuean, Rarotongan, Tokelauan, and Tuvaluan; it evolved to the later form  in Samoan, Tahitian, some Rapa dialects, and Hawaiian); or it might be borrowed or mixed with the English 'porker'. It is hard to say, since Polynesian peoples populated their islands bringing pigs with them from East Asia, but no pigs were brought to Aotearoa by them. It is also sometimes claimed that  means 'white pig' or 'unwelcome white stranger'. However, no part of the word signifies 'pig', 'white', 'unwelcome', or 'stranger'.

Attitudes to the term
New Zealanders of European ancestry vary in their attitudes toward the word Pākehā when applied to themselves. Some embrace it wholeheartedly as a sign of their connection to New Zealand, in contrast to the European identity of their forebears. Others object to the word, some strongly, saying it is offensive in origin, claiming it to be derogatory or to carry implications of being an outsider, although this is often based on false information about the meaning of the term. Some believe being labelled Pākehā compromises their status and their birthright links to New Zealand. In the 1986 census, over 36,000 respondents ignored the ethnicities offered, including Pākehā, writing-in their ethnicity as 'New Zealander', or ignoring the question completely. A joint response code of 'NZ European or Pakeha' was tried in the 1996 census, but was replaced by "New Zealand European" in later censuses because it drew what Statistics New Zealand described as a "significant adverse reaction from some respondents". Sociologist Paul Spoonley criticised the new version, however, saying that many Pākehā would not identify as European.

The term Pākehā is also sometimes used among New Zealanders of European ancestry in distinction to the Māori term  (foreigner), as an act of emphasising their claims of belonging to the space of New Zealand in contrast to more recent arrivals. Those who prefer to emphasise nationality rather than ethnicity in relating to others living in New Zealand may refer to all New Zealand citizens only as 'New Zealanders' or by the colloquial term 'Kiwis'.

The term is commonly used by a range of journalists and columnists from The New Zealand Herald, the country's largest-circulation daily newspaper. Historian Judith Binney called herself a Pākehā and said, "I think it is the most simple and practical term. It is a name given to us by Māori. It has no pejorative associations like people think it does—it's a descriptive term. I think it's nice to have a name the people who live here gave you, because that's what I am."
New Zealand writer and historian Michael King wrote in 1985: "To say something is Pakeha in character is not to diminish its New Zealand-ness, as some people imply. It is to emphasise it."
New Zealand politicians from across the political spectrum use the term, including Don Brash, John Key, Helen Clark, and Te Ururoa Flavell.

See also

 European New Zealanders
 Europeans in Oceania
 Gaijin, "foreigner" in Japanese
 Gweilo, Cantonese slang for "foreigner" (lit. "ghost person")
 Laowai, Mandarin slang for "foreigner"
 Gringo, Mexican slur for white Americans
 Kabloona, Inuktitut for "bushy-eyebrowed" white outsider, ignoramus
 Haole, the analogous Hawaiian term
 Palagi, a term in Samoan sometimes used to describe foreigners
 Pākehā settlers
 Pākehā privilege

References

Further reading
 Hoani Nahe, "The Origins of the Words 'Pakeha' and 'Kaipuke, Journal of the Polynesian Society, vol. 3, December 1894

External links 
 

Society of New Zealand
Māori words and phrases
Ethno-cultural designations
European New Zealander
White culture in Oceania